Changrod is a village in Charkhi Dadri tehsil, Charkhi Dadri district of Haryana State, India. It falls under Hisar Division and is located approximately 43 kilometers south, towards the Bhiwani District.

Location and weather 
Changrod is located in the Charkhi Dadri taluka (tehsil) of Charkhi Dadri district.

Changroad is dry and quite hot in the summer, experiencing inverse conditions in the winter with gusts of wind.

Demographics 

Most of the people in Changrod are from the Yaduvanshi Ahir / Yadava community, which belongs to the Dabur gotra. There is a sizable community of other castes, such as Brahmins, Banias, Kumhars, Darzis, Khatis and Harijans. There are also a small number of Bawariyas and a single Muslim family, who were saved by the village people during the 1947 Partition of India.

, the population of Changrod was 3,604; 1,908 males and 1,696 females. The literacy rate for the village is 81% with 94% of males and 67% of females being educated.

Education
The village has two primary schools each for boys and girls, Meva Devi Girls Primary School was constructed by Sh.Omprakash Sharma and Sh.Dayanand Sharma in the memory of their late mother Smt.Meva Devi Sharma to promote girls education in 1991 and one privately owned primary school. The Higher secondary school has served the village for more than 40 years. The village has connectivity to cellphone and internet [Jio, Idea-Vodafone, BSNL]. The public transport system is fairly basic, even after years of road connectivity to Charkhi Dadri and Kanina.

Employment 
Most of the village's residents work on ancestral farms but they also have a special attachment to the Indian Armed Forces. The village has  many Senior Commissioned Officers. The village also has Commandant Rank Officers and Assistant Account Officer in central government. The younger residents are employed in medicine, artificial intelligence, data science, engineering technology and teaching. There are doctors, professors, Commissioned Officers, Subedar Majors and technocrats too in the village.

Agriculture 
There is an acute shortage of ground water in the village because it only rains during the months of July and August. There are irrigation canals on both sides of village, but usually they are dry and crops depend on rain. The major crops of this area are millet, wheat, mustard and chickpea.

References 

Villages in Charkhi Dadri district